Paul-Henri Mathieu was the defending champion, but chose not to participate that year.

Qualifier Gilles Simon won in the final 7–5, 6–2, against fifth-seeded Julien Benneteau.

Seeds

Draw

Finals

Top half

Bottom half

External links
Association of Tennis Professionals (ATP) singles draw
Association of Tennis Professionals (ATP) qualifying draw

Singles